The 2017 Women's South American Volleyball Club Championship was the ninth official edition of the women's volleyball tournament, played by six teams from 14–18 February 2017 in Uberaba and Uberlândia, Brazil. Rio de Janeiro won its third consecutive title, the fourth overall, and qualified for the 2017 FIVB Volleyball Women's Club World Championship in Kobe, Japan. Gabriela Guimarães was elected the Most Valuable Player.

Competing clubs
Teams were seeded in two pools of three according to how the representatives of their countries finished in the 2016 edition.

Preliminary round

Pool A

|}

|}

Pool B

|}

|}

Final round

Bracket

Fifth place match

|}

Semifinals

|}

Third place match

|}

Final

|}

Final standing

All-Star team

Most Valuable Player
 Gabriela Guimarães (Rexona-Sesc)
Best Opposite
 Monique Pavão (Rexona-Sesc)
Best Outside Hitters
 Alix Klineman (Dentil/Praia Clube)
 Ángela Leyva (Universidad San Martín)

Best Setter
 Roberta Ratzke (Rexona-Sesc) 
Best Middle Blockers
 Fabiana Claudino (Dentil/Praia Clube)
 Walewska Oliveira (Dentil/Praia Clube)
Best Libero
 Fabiana de Oliveira (Rexona-Sesc)

See also
2017 Men's South American Volleyball Club Championship

References

South American Volleyball Club Championship
2017 in Brazilian sport
2017
International volleyball competitions hosted by Brazil
Sport in Minas Gerais
February 2017 sports events in South America
2017 in Brazilian women's sport